Bergman is a Swedish surname.

Bergman may also refer to:

 Bergman, California, a former settlement in US
 Bergman (Edmonton), a neighbourhood in Edmonton, Canada
 Bergman (crater),  a lunar crater
 Bergman Brook, a stream in Minnesota